Frederico Filipe Teixeira Ribeiro (born 5 April 1982 in Felgueiras), known as Zamorano, is a Portuguese retired footballer. Mainly a right midfielder, he could also appear as a right back.

External links

1982 births
Living people
People from Felgueiras
Portuguese footballers
Association football midfielders
Primeira Liga players
Liga Portugal 2 players
Segunda Divisão players
F.C. Felgueiras players
Leixões S.C. players
C.F. Estrela da Amadora players
C.D. Trofense players
Gondomar S.C. players
F.C. Penafiel players
Boavista F.C. players
F.C. Felgueiras 1932 players
Portugal youth international footballers
Sportspeople from Porto District